There are several school districts in the United States called Ashland School District, including:

Ashland Independent School District — Ashland, Kentucky
Ashland District School — Ashland, Maine
Ashland City School District — Ashland, Ohio
Ashland School District (Oregon) — Ashland, Oregon
Ashland School District (Wisconsin) — Ashland, Wisconsin